Eric Lopez (born March 5, 1999) is an American professional soccer player who plays as a goalkeeper for MLS Next Pro club Austin FC II.

Career

Youth
Lopez began playing with the LA Galaxy academy in 2012.

Professional
Lopez signed with LA Galaxy II ahead of their 2015 season. He was the youngest player ever to sign a United Soccer League contract.

Lopez made his professional debut for LA Galaxy II as a 20th-minute substitute against Orange County Blues on August 20, 2016. He then became the starting goalkeeper for Los Dos in the middle of the 2017 USL season.

On January 15, 2020, Lopez joined LA Galaxy's MLS roster.

Lopez was released from Galaxy's main MLS roster following the 2021 season, but signed with Galaxy II on March 3, 2022.

On January 10, 2023, Lopez was signed to a one year contract with the newly formed Austin FC II team.

International
Born in the United States, Lopez is of Mexican descent. He has played regularly with United States youth teams. He was the youngest player to be named to the United States under-17 final squad for the 2015 FIFA U-17 World Cup.

Club

References

External links 
 Galaxy Academy Profile

1999 births
Living people
American soccer players
American sportspeople of Mexican descent
Association football goalkeepers
Homegrown Players (MLS)
People from Westminster, California
Soccer players from California
Sportspeople from Orange County, California
United States men's youth international soccer players
USL Championship players